Francis Armstrong (1813–1897) was a missionary.

Francis Armstrong may also refer to:

Francis Armstrong (mayor) (1839–1899), mayor of Salt Lake City
Francis Armstrong (captain) (c. 1859–1923), Canadian steamboat captain
Sir Francis Armstrong, 3rd Baronet (1871–1944) of the Armstrong baronets

See also
Frank Armstrong (disambiguation)